The 7th Hunt is an independent horror film from Australia, directed by J.D. Cohen, co-directed by Darren K Hawkins for Cinegear Productions/Coherent Productions in 2008 and first screened in 2009. It is widely considered to be of the Ozploitation (Australian Exploitation) genre. The plot revolves around a group of sadistic killers and their victims. The film featured in the New York City Horror Film Festival in 2009, the Grimm Up North Film Festival in the UK, and the Atlanta Horror Film Festival. The film stars actress and swimsuit model Imogen Bailey of Neighbours fame.

Critical response
Dread Central rated the film 1/5, calling it "yet another post-Saw abduction/torture flick on a low budget", made with a lack of skill and with one-dimensional characters.  Horror Chronicles criticised the production values and noted a similarity to Hostel but suggested it might appeal to fans of torture porn.  Horror News was more positive, praising it for some originality, while noting the lack of a backstory.

Main cast
Cassady Maddox as Callie Clarke
Imogen Bailey as Ariel Clarke
Olivia Solomons as Sarah Fairmont
Matthew Charleston as Ricky Walker
Kain O'Keefe as Chris Roberts
Sarah Mawbey as Catherine (The Inquisitor)
Tasneem Roc as Becky (The Hand)
Jason Stojanovski as The Sniper
Darren K. Hawkins as The Hacker
Malcolm Frawley as The Knife
Chris Galetti as The Mastermind

References

External links
 Official Website
 The 7th Hunt on IMDb

Films shot in Sydney
Australian independent films
2000s Australian films